Liana Ruokytė-Jonsson (born 1966) is a Lithuanian politician. From 13 December 2016 to 21 December 2018, she served as Minister of Culture in the Skvernelis Cabinet led by Prime Minister Saulius Skvernelis.

References 

Living people
1966 births
Place of birth missing (living people)
21st-century Lithuanian politicians
Ministers of Culture of Lithuania